This article contains records and statistics for the Japanese professional football club, Júbilo Iwata.

J. League

Domestic cup competitions

International Competitions

Top scorers by season

Previous record as Yamaha Motor Corporation's team

1Not chosen for new J. League, so a de facto relegation.

References

Júbilo Iwata
Jubilo Iwata